Belmont is a town in Tishomingo County, Mississippi, United States. The population was 2,021 at the 2010 census.

History 
The settlement of Belmont was originally called Gum Springs with a post office built in 1884. After completion of the Birmingham Division of the Illinois Central Railroad in 1907 the town grew considerably. It was incorporated as Belmont (meaning "beautiful mountain") on January 22, 1908.

Geography
The town is concentrated along Mississippi Highway 25 in southern Tishomingo County, a few miles west of the Mississippi-Alabama state line. Golden borders Belmont to the southeast, and Tishomingo lies a few miles to the north. Mississippi Highway 366 intersects MS 25 in Belmont, and continues southeastward through Golden to the state line, eventually becoming 4th Street in Red Bay, Alabama.

Communities near Belmont
 Golden - 
 Red Bay, Alabama - 
 Tishomingo - 
 Vina, Alabama - 
 Dennis - about

Demographics

2020 census

As of the 2020 United States census, there were 1,859 people, 862 households, and 593 families residing in the town.

2000 census
As of the census of 2000, there were 1,961 people, 799 households, and 555 families residing in the town. The population density was 415.7 people per square mile (160.4/km2). There were 895 housing units at an average density of 189.7 per square mile (73.2/km2). The racial makeup of the town was 92.71% White, 0.56% African American, 6.22% from other races, and 0.51% from two or more races. Hispanic or Latino of any race were 8.11% of the population.

There were 799 households, out of which 34.0% had children under the age of 18 living with them, 52.3% were married couples living together, 12.6% had a female householder with no husband present, and 30.5% were non-families. 28.8% of all households were made up of individuals, and 14.9% had someone living alone who was 65 years of age or older. The average household size was 2.45 and the average family size was 2.97.

In the town, the population was spread out, with 26.3% under the age of 18, 8.6% from 18 to 24, 28.6% from 25 to 44, 22.3% from 45 to 64, and 14.3% who were 65 years of age or older. The median age was 35 years. For every 100 females, there were 91.7 males. For every 100 females age 18 and over, there were 87.1 males.

The median income for a household in the town was $29,702, and the median income for a family was $37,639. Males had a median income of $27,404 versus $20,192 for females. The per capita income for the town was $16,122. About 10.9% of families and 14.7% of the population were below the poverty line, including 16.2% of those under age 18 and 16.0% of those age 65 or over.

Government
Belmont's current mayor is Buddy Wiltshire. The five aldermen are Mike Braden, Robert Hester, Mike Neighbors, Brandon Pharr, Steve Smith.

Education

Colleges
Northeast Mississippi Community College - Belmont lies within the Northeast Mississippi Community College District.

Public schools

Belmont School - grades K-12 with 1538 students Home of the Cardinals.

Private schools
Emanuel Christian School - a coed private school with grades PK-12 and an enrollment of 52 students

Libraries
 Belmont Public Library, a branch of the Northeast Regional Library

Transportation

Highways 
 Mississippi Highway 25 - north-south corridor that travels from Jackson, Mississippi to the Tennessee state line
 Mississippi Highway 366 - runs southeast to the Alabama state line

Air travel
 Tishomingo County Airport

Notable residents
 Mac McAnally - singer/songwriter

References

External links
 
 A Place Called Belmont by Jerry Martin

Towns in Tishomingo County, Mississippi
Towns in Mississippi